The 1904 Auburn Tigers football team represented Auburn University in the 1904 Southern Intercollegiate Athletic Association football season.

The team went undefeated, winning all five of its regular season games.  It also won two "practice" games against Montgomery and the University of Florida.  The Tigers defense was nearly perfect, outscoring opponents 73–11 in regular season play and completing three shut outs (five counting the practice games). This was the first undefeated Auburn team since 1900 and was the fourth time the Tigers went undefeated.

The squad was coached by Mike Donahue in his first year as a head football coach. Donahue coached two separate times at Auburn (1904–1906 and 1908–1922) before moving to LSU. He also served as athletic director, basketball coach, baseball coach, and track coach during his tenure. Donahue still ranks second on Auburn football coaches' all-time career win list and third in winning percentage.

Before the season
Auburn hired former Yale substitute quarterback Mike Donahue. Humphrey Foy recovered from a broken collarbone.

Schedule

‡The October 4, 1904, game against the University of Florida was considered a practice game by Auburn and is not included in the official record of 5–0 for the season.  Furthermore, the institution known as the University of Florida in 1904 was located in Lake City, Florida, and was previously known as Florida Agricultural College.  It was one of four colleges combined to form the modern-day University of Florida in Gainesville, Florida, under the Buckman Act passed by the Florida Legislature in May 1905.  Since the present-day institution known as the University of Florida did not exist prior to 1905, it does not recognize this game.

Season summary

at Clemson

Sources:

"The game was slow. Neither team was at its best." Humphrey Foy went around end on a double pass for an 18-yard touchdown, the game's only score. "Referee Beaver says it was one of the fiercest of games and that Clemson's defense was superb but the team lacked snap and ginger."

The starting lineup was Wilkinson (left end), Streit (left tackle), Ringey (left guard), Butler (center), Moon (right guard), Jones (right tackle), Paterson (right end), Perkins (quarterback), Foy (left halfback), Reynolds (right halfback), Lacey (fullback).

Nashville
Auburn easily defeated Nashville 10–0. Foy ran the second half kick off back for a touchdown. "Foy and Reynolds gained ground every time they were given the ball...The Auburn team is 50 per cent stronger now than it was at this time last year, and Coach Donohue is doing wonderful work with his material."

The starting lineup was Paterson (left end), Streit (left tackle), Bigney (left guard), Butler (center), Moon (right guard), Jones (right tackle), Wilkinson (right end), Perkins (quarterback), Foy (left halfback), Reynolds (right halfback), Lacey (fullback).

Georgia Tech

Sources:

Donahue's Auburn team beat first year head coach John Heisman's Georgia Tech 12–0, making two touchdowns in the first half.

The starting lineup was Wilkinson (left end), Street (left tackle), Braswell (left guard), Butler (center), Moon (right guard), Jones (right tackle), Patterson (right end), Perkins (quarterback), Reynolds (left halfback), Foy (right halfback), Lacey (fullback).

Alabama
Auburn beat Alabama 29–6. Auburn used a delayed buck effectively. On this play, blockers swept around end, faking the ball. The ball carrier then drove through the line for substantial gains.

Georgia

Sources:

Auburn closed the undefeated season with a 17–5 win over the Georgia Bulldogs. For the first score, Lacey ran in a 5-yard touchdown. Georgia answered with its own score. Lacey drove in another touchdown later, before the half ended. Lacey again got a 5-yard touchdown in the second half to make it 17–5.

The starting lineup was Paterson (left end), Streit (left tackle), Braswell (left guard), Butler (center), Moon (right guard), Hughes (right tackle), Wilkinson (right end), Perkins (quarterback), Foy (left halfback), Reynolds (right halfback), Lacey (fullback).

Postseason
Humphrey Foy was All-Southern.

References

Auburn
Auburn Tigers football seasons
College football undefeated seasons
Auburn Tigers football